Hyrynsalmi is a municipality in Finland and is part of the Kainuu region.

The municipality is unilingually Finnish.

The world championships in swamp football is held annually in Hyrynsalmi.

References

External links

 Municipality of Hyrynsalmi – Official website
 Map of Hyrynsalmi (PDF file)

 
Municipalities of Kainuu